The 1957 Tulsa Golden Hurricane football team represented the University of Tulsa during the 1957 NCAA University Division football season. In their third year under head coach Bobby Dodds, the Golden Hurricane compiled a 4–6 record (2–2 against Missouri Valley Conference opponents), and finished in third place in the conference. The team's statistical leaders included George Cagliola with 239 passing yards, Ronnie Morris with 569 rushing yards, and Dick Brown with 104 receiving yards.

Schedule

References

Tulsa
Tulsa Golden Hurricane football seasons
Tulsa Golden Hurricane football